Jamrud Tehsil is a subdivision located in Khyber District, Khyber Pakhtunkhwa, Pakistan. The population is 228,001 according to the 2017 census.

See also 
 Jamrud
 List of tehsils of Khyber Pakhtunkhwa

References 

Tehsils of Khyber Pakhtunkhwa
Populated places in Khyber District